Vilho Turunen (16 December 1923, Polvijärvi - 8 February 1973) was a Finnish agricultural worker, logger, trade union functionary and politician. He was a member of the Parliament of Finland from 1958 to 1962. Turunen was at first a member of the Social Democratic Party of Finland (SDP) and later of the Social Democratic Union of Workers and Smallholders (TPSL).

References

1923 births
1973 deaths
People from Polvijärvi
Social Democratic Party of Finland politicians
Social Democratic Union of Workers and Smallholders politicians
Members of the Parliament of Finland (1958–62)